The Mosman Golf Club was established in 1923 on Middle Head, in the Sydney harbourside suburb of . The club officiated the construction and management of a 24 hectare, 9-hole golf course built on land acquired from the Commonwealth government under a 21-year lease on the condition that, if required, the land could be repossessed without compensation.
This occurred in 1940, with the onset of World War II, when the Australian Government resumed the land and the clubhouse for military use. The club was closed consequently.

See also

List of golf courses in New South Wales

References

External links 
 Mosman Historical Society article

1923 establishments in Australia
Sports clubs established in 1923
Sports venues completed in 1923
Golf clubs and courses in New South Wales
Sporting clubs in Sydney
Sports venues in Sydney